{{safesubst:#invoke:RfD|||month = March
|day = 15
|year = 2023
|time = 21:35
|timestamp = 20230315213535

|content=
REDIRECT Thomas Beatie#Early life

}}